Adrian Virgil Pintea (9 October 1954 – 8 June 2007) was a Romanian actor.

Career
Pintea graduated from the Theatrical and Cinematographical Arts Institute in Bucharest. He appeared in the 2005 Romanian film Femeia visurilor directed by Dan Pița. Pintea made his last appearance in Francis Ford Coppola's 2007 film Youth Without Youth. He died on 8 June 2007 from complications from cirrhosis, pulmonary and kidney hypertension, and was buried at Bellu Cemetery in Bucharest.

Selected filmography

  (1978), as the boy with the bird
  (1977), as Ștefan Octavian Iosif
  (1979), as George Praida
  (1979), as Teodor Diamant
  (1981), as Iancu Jianu
  (1981), as Iancu Jianu
  (1981), as Nicolae Tonitza
  (1985), as Lică
  (1985), as the piano technician
  (1987), as Iorgovan
 Those Who Pay With Their Lives (1989), as Gelu Ruscanu
 Mircea (1989), as Vlad, the son of Mircea the Elder
  (1990), as Mihai Eminescu
 Diplomatic Siege (1999), as Goran Mladenov
 Vlad (2003), as Iancu de Hunedoara 
 7 Seconds (film) (2005), as Grapini

References

External links

1954 births
2007 deaths
People from Beiuș
Caragiale National University of Theatre and Film alumni
21st-century Romanian male actors
Romanian male film actors
Romanian male stage actors
Deaths from cirrhosis
Deaths from hypertension
Burials at Bellu Cemetery